The 2015–16 season of the Hessenliga, the highest association football league in the German state of Hesse, was the eighth season of the league at tier five (V) of the German football league system and the 38th season overall since establishment of the league in 1978, then as the Oberliga Hessen.

The season began on 24 July 2015 and finished on 21 May 2016, interrupted by a winter break from 12 December to 20 February.

Standings 
The 2015–16 season saw five new clubs in the league, Borussia Fulda, Teutonia Watzenborn-Steinberg, SC Hessen Dreieich and Rot-Weiss Frankfurt, all four promoted from the Verbandsligas, while KSV Baunatal was relegated from the Regionalliga Südwest.

Top goalscorers
The top goal scorers for the season:

Promotion play-off
Promotion play-off will be held at the end of the season for both the Regionalliga above and the Oberliga.

To the Regionalliga
The runners-up of the Hessenliga, Oberliga Baden-Württemberg and Oberliga Rheinland-Pfalz/Saar competed for one more spot in the Regionalliga Südwest, with each team playing the other just once:

To the Oberliga
The runners-up of the Verbandsliga Hessen-Nord, Verbandsliga Hessen-Süd and Verbandsliga Hessen-Mitte compete for two more spots in the Oberliga which FC Ederbergland and Rot-Weiß Darmstadt won.

References

External links 
 Hessenliga on Fupa.net 

Hessenliga seasons
Hessenliga